"Chapter 3" (or "Episode 103") is the third episode of the first season of the American political thriller drama series House of Cards. It premiered on February 1, 2013, when it was released along with the rest of the first season on the American streaming service Netflix.

Plot
Frank (Kevin Spacey) is in the middle of negotiating the education bill with Marty Spinella (Al Sapienza), head of a teacher's union, when he learns that a 17-year-old girl has been killed due to texting while driving in his hometown of Gaffney, South Carolina, while being distracted by the Peachoid, a water tower shaped like a peach that Frank had advocated to keep standing. County administrator Oren Chase (Murphy Guyer), a Republican rival of Frank's who wants his congressional seat, urges the girl's parents to file a lawsuit against him.

Despite Linda (Sakina Jaffrey) and Spinella's protests, Frank leaves for Gaffney. There, he meets the girl's parents and delivers a eulogy at her funeral, offering a settlement of $150,000 and promising to sponsor billboards warning against texting while driving. When the parents don't seem satisfied, he asks Reverend Jenkins (Bill Phillips) to arrange the following morning's service to give him the pulpit. Meanwhile, Claire (Robin Wright) tries to recruit Gillian Cole (Sandrine Holt), the head of a competing environmental nonprofit, but is refused. Unfazed, Claire follows Gillian home and, noting that she can't afford treatment for her chronic illness, promises her health insurance.

Zoe (Kate Mara) makes numerous media appearances as a result of her leak of Durant's (Jayne Atkinson) nomination for Secretary of State. Her off-the-cuff comments during interviews lead to a rift with Hammerschmidt (Boris McGiver), who suspends her for a month. Meanwhile, Russo (Corey Stoll) starts making efforts to put his life back in order to maintain his relationship with Christina (Kristen Connolly), who is considering taking a job with House Speaker Bob Birch. He gets rid of his drug stash and tells Christina that he doesn't want her to leave.

In South Carolina, Frank continues negotiating the education bill via conference call. After phoning Claire, he sends flirtatious texts to Zoe, leading to intimate conversations. During the service he demonstrates how his oratory skills helped him rise in Washington, and gives a passionate old-school sermon around the "idea of hate", going so far as to yell, "I hate you, God" in front of a South Carolina congregation. He's then able to connect to the parishioners by making them equals, saying they've all done this before when feeling soul-crushing loss, and two among them are feeling that today.

Frank invites the parents to lunch, where discussions get heated with Underwood asking them if they want him to resign. He ends up on good terms with them, announcing a Furman University scholarship in their daughter's honor. In order to take Oren down, he finds out that the responsibility for guardrails is the county's—but none have been built. Along with the mayor, Frank visits Oren and confronts him with that responsibility: "If there were guardrails the car wouldn't flip three times and the county administrator didn't build those guardrails and now she's dead." He also tells Oren that the planned power lines that the mayor has blocked because they would fall on Oren's property can go up this year if he claims it as eminent domain.

Cast
Following is the list of billed cast.

Main cast 
 Kevin Spacey as U.S. Representative Francis J. Underwood 
 Robin Wright as Claire Underwood, Francis' wife
 Kate Mara as Zoe Barnes, reporter at The Washington Herald
 Corey Stoll as U.S. Representative Peter Russo
 Michael Kelly as Doug Stamper, Underwood's Chief of Staff
 Sakina Jaffrey as Linda Vasquez, White House Chief of Staff
 Kristen Connolly as  Christina Gallagher, a congressional staffer
 Sandrine Holt as Gillian Cole, an employee at CWI
 Boris McGiver as Tom Hammerschmidt, editor-in-chief for The Washington Herald

Recurring characters

 Elizabeth Norment as Nancy Kaufberger
 Rachel Brosnahan as Rachel Posner
 Nathan Darrow as Edward Meechum    
 Al Sapienza as Martin Spinella    
 Kathleen Chalfant as Margaret Tilden    
 Soledad O'Brien as herself 
 Murphy Guyer as Oren Chase    
 Clark Carmichael as Dean Masters
 Angela Christian as Leanne Masters

Guest characters
 Bill Phillips as Reverend Jenkins

Reception
The episode received positive reviews from critics. Ryan McGee of The A.V. Club  said, "the episode traversed in those soon-to-be-forgotten tales, even if the impact of them will be felt for the rest of this series."

Notes

External links
 House of Cards on Netflix
 

2013 American television episodes
House of Cards (American TV series) episodes